Alive in Studio A is a heavy metal album released by Iron Maiden frontman Bruce Dickinson in 1995.

The album does not include new songs but instead re-recordings of songs from Bruce's first two solo-albums Tattooed Millionaire and Balls to Picasso with his new band line-up. This line-up would record the next album, Skunkworks. The first CD was recorded live at Metropolis Studios, London, while the second CD is composed of live-recordings at the Marquee Club with his new band.

The idea was for a low-key release of these double albums, and, according to the booklet in the 2005 re-release, Bruce Dickinson was less than pleased when the record company tried to pass them off as new material. Alive In Studio A was originally meant as a live session to be played on a US radio station, however, this never took place.

Track listings 
Disc one – Alive in Studio A
 "Cyclops" – 7:15
 "Shoot All the Clowns" – 4:55
 "Son of a Gun" – 5:44
 "Tears of the Dragon" – 6:27
 "1000 Points of Light" – 3:53
 "Sacred Cowboys" – 3:56
 "Tattooed Millionaire" – 3:55
 "Born in '58" – 3:23
 "Fire" – 4:57
 "Change of Heart" – 4:39
 "Hell No" – 5:11
 "Laughing in the Hiding Bush" – 4:08

Disc two – Alive at the Marquee
 "Cyclops" – 7:54
 "1000 Points of Light" – 4:02
 "Born in '58" – 3:15
 "Gods of War" – 5:10
 "Change of Heart" – 4:29
 "Laughing in the Hiding Bush" – 3:51
 "Hell No" – 6:02
 "Tears of the Dragon" – 6:19
 "Shoot All the Clowns" – 5:06
 "Sacred Cowboys" – 4:17
 "Son of a Gun" – 5:41
 "Tattooed Millionaire" – 6:17

Personnel
Musicians
 Bruce Dickinson – vocals
 Alex Dickson – guitar
 Chris Dale – bass
 Alessandro Elena – drums

Production
Spencer May – engineer, mixing
Tim Summerhayes – Fleetwood Mobile engineer

References

External links 
 

Bruce Dickinson live albums
1995 live albums
CMC International live albums
Live albums recorded at The Marquee Club
Castle Communications live albums